BXR or bxr may refer to:

 The Russia Buriat language 
 BXR bikes (bicycle crossroadster), a type of a touring bicycle
 Bam Airport, Iran
 Buxar railway station, India